"Blame It on the Boogie" is a song released in 1978 by English singer-songwriter Mick Jackson. It has been covered by numerous other artists, including The Jacksons. The song was performed on Musikladen (January 1979), Aplauso (February 1979), Sonja's Goed Nieuws Show (2 February 1979) and ABBA Special: Disco in the Snow Part 1 (18 February 1979).

Background
The song was co-authored by Mick Jackson (credited as Michael George Jackson-Clarke) as well as Mick's brother David Jackson and Elmar Krohn.

Although Mick Jackson recorded the song in 1977, "Blame It on the Boogie" was written in hopes of being sold to Stevie Wonder.

The two versions of the song were widely released by the artists' respective labels - Warner Bros. and CBS - within one day of each other.  Mick Jackson's track was showcased in 1978 at Midem where, according to Mick Jackson, "The Jacksons' manager [Peter Kerstin] heard the track being played...and took a tape recording of it...back to the States [where] the Jacksons quickly recorded a version so it would be out before mine." The Mick Jackson recording was released by Atlantic Records in the US in August 1978 when it reached #61, and #15 in the UK.

According to Michael Jackson of the Jacksons, Bobby Colomby, who was producing the Jacksons' Destiny album, brought the group "Blame It on the Boogie". "It was an uptempo, finger-poppin'-time type song that was a good vehicle for the band approach we wanted to cultivate. I had fun slurring the chorus: [the lyric] 'Blame It on the Boogie' could be sung in one breath without putting my lips together."

Record World praised Michael Jackson's "silky vocals and energetic youthful delivery."

Personnel
Michael Jackson – lead vocals, rhythm arrangements
Jackie Jackson, Marlon Jackson, Randy Jackson – background vocals, rhythm arrangements
Tito Jackson – guitar, background vocals, vocal arrangements
John Luongo  – mixing
Don Murray – engineer
Bobby Colomby, Mike Atkinson – executive producer

Additional musicians
Roland Bautista, Michael Sembello – guitar
Nathan Watts, Gary King – bass guitar
Greg Phillinganes – keyboards, rhythm arrangements
Rick Marotta – drums, percussion
Laudir de Oliveira, Claudio Slon – percussion (congas)
Jerry Hey – horn arrangements

Chart records
Despite the Mick Jackson original reaching a No. 61 peak on the Billboard Hot 100 in September 1978, Epic Records that month released the Jacksons' version of "Blame It on the Boogie" as the advance single from the Destiny album. Although "Blame It on the Boogie" returned the Jacksons to the Hot 100 after five flop singles, it was not the single to effect a major comeback for the Jacksons, peaking at #54; it would be the follow-up, "Shake Your Body (Down to the Ground)", which would briefly restore the Jacksons' Top Ten fortunes. However, "Blame It on the Boogie" did reach No. 3 R&B and would be coupled with "Shake Your Body (Down to the Ground)" on an extended club play single which would reach No. 20 on the dance charts in 1979.

In the UK, both the Mick Jackson version and the Jacksons' were released within a few days of each other in September 1978. The UK music press, struck by the rival versions being by similarly named artists, declared a "Battle of the Boogie" which Mick Jackson recalls as "great publicity...There was an equal balance of interest from the media about both releases – A good example is that my version came out first on Top of the Pops... The  had the second week...Radio One played The  version and Capital Radio only played mine – It was fair."

The Jacksons' version—incorrectly lauded by Melody Maker as their "self-penned song"—was the more successful version reaching Number 8 on the chart dated 4 November 1978; the Mick Jackson version—hailed by NME as "far superior"—had peaked at Number 15 on the chart for 21 October.

Mick Jackson himself in 2003 said of the Jacksons' version of "Blame It on the Boogie": "[the original] version had 100% of our heart and soul in it but the Jacksons' version had the magic extra 2% that made it incredible."

Music video
A promotional music video by the Jacksons was created for "Blame It on the Boogie" in 1978. The video, featuring the group's members dancing on a black background, relied heavily on electronic trail effects, created at Image West, Ltd. using then-cutting edge equipment: the Scanimate analog computer system and a Quantel DFS 3000 digital framestore.
The video also appears on the bonus disc of the DVD box set Michael Jackson's Vision.

Michael Jackson's 1993 biography states that the video marked his video debut. The Jacksons' very first promotional music video was "Enjoy Yourself".

Charts

Mick Jackson version

Weekly charts

The Jacksons version

Weekly charts

Year-end charts

Big Fun version

Weekly charts

Year-end charts

Certifications

The Jacksons version

Other versions

Tina Charles has stated that she recorded "Blame It on the Boogie" prior to the Jacksons; her version was not released as "Sony [felt] it was not a strong enough song."

1980: Marie Rottrová one of the top singers in former Czechoslovakia recorded a Czech version of this song called in her cover version "Muž č. 1" /Man no. 1/
1983: Ashaye covered the song as part of his single "Michael Jackson Melody".
1989: Stock Aitken Waterman had Big Fun remake "Blame It on the Boogie" with a resultant best ever Pop chart peak of Number 4 in the UK.
1990: Luis Miguel covered the song in Spanish as "Será Que No Me Amas" on the album 20 Años. The lyrics were adapted in Spanish by Juan Carlos Calderón. The song was released as the third single from the album and it received radio airplay in Mexico. A live version of the song was featured on El Concierto (1995).
1998: Dance act Clock brought "Blame It on the Boogie" back to the UK Top 20 (Number 16).
2001: Will Young sang "Blame It on the Boogie" for his first audition of Pop Idol on ITV in 2001.
2003: "Blame It on the Boogie" was the lead single off the Michael Jackson tribute album Bringin You the Magic recorded by Jay Kid a native of Denmark (born Yannick Harrison 8 January 1990) who in September 2003 became the first artist to perform at the Neverland Ranch at Michael Jackson's express invitation.
2004: German eurodance act Captain Jack covered the song on their album Café Cubar.
2005: the top ten finalists of the French televised Nouvelle Star cut a remake, which reached Number 15 in France.
2008: The song was performed by Westlife on their Back Home Tour.
2009: The song was performed as a line dance at a camp for children recovering from open heart surgeries by cast members in Episode 21 of Season 15 of ER.
2009: In the wake of the interest in Michael Jackson's recordings initiated after his death on 25 June "Blame It on the Boogie" entered the charts in Australia and the UK.
2009, Hong Kong singer Susan Wong included a cover of the song on her smooth jazz / bossa nova album 511.
2009: The song was performed by The Saturdays in one venue of their The Work Tour, due to Michael Jackson's death.
2010: The song was performed by children at the Albert Hall in a Michael Jackson medley.
2011: The song was performed by Jermaine Jackson, brother of The Jacksons. The music video for the version was completed late 2011 and was released January 2012 on international music video websites.
2012: The song was performed by an a cappella group called "The Footnotes" in the film Pitch Perfect.

Documentary
In 2010, filmmaker Patrick Nation made a Channel 4 documentary about Mick Jackson and the story of the song, entitled The Other Michael Jackson: Battle of the Boogie. The documentary was co-written and presented by Mick's son Sam Peter Jackson and led to Mick Jackson's 1978 album Weekend (which features the original version of "Blame It on the Boogie") being re-released (for download on the iTunes Store) for the first time in 30 years by Demon Music. To promote the documentary, Mick gave a rare television interview to BBC Breakfast.

References

External links
Mick Jackson  – official website
Documentary about The Battle of The Boogie at Channel 4
Mick Jackson discography at Discogs
Mick Jackson discography at Disco-disco
 

1978 singles
1989 singles
The Jackson 5 songs
Mick Jackson (singer) songs
Luis Miguel songs
Disco songs
Songs written by Mick Jackson (singer)
Big Fun (band) songs
1978 songs
Songs about dancing
Epic Records singles
CBS Records singles
Columbia Records singles
Jive Records singles